Coldbrook Farm is a historic home and farm located at Chambersburg in Franklin County, Pennsylvania. The property has a large stone house, a frame bank barn, and a stone spring house. All were built about 1800. The house consists of a two-story, five bay, central section in the Georgian style, flanked by two-story, three bay recessed wings.  Colonial Revival-style modifications, such as roof dormers and colonnade were added in the late-19th century.

It was listed on the National Register of Historic Places in 1996.

References 

Houses completed in 1800
Houses on the National Register of Historic Places in Pennsylvania
Georgian architecture in Pennsylvania
Colonial Revival architecture in Pennsylvania
Houses in Franklin County, Pennsylvania
National Register of Historic Places in Franklin County, Pennsylvania